Alina Hrushyna-Akobiia (sometimes: Alina Akobiyan) is a Ukrainian freestyle wrestler. She won the gold medal in the 57 kg event at the 2022 European Wrestling Championships held in Budapest, Hungary.

She married Oleksandr Hrushyn, a Ukrainian Greco-Roman world team member 2022.

Career 

In 2019, at the World U23 Wrestling Championship in Budapest, Hungary, she won the silver medal in the 57 kg event. Two years earlier, at the 2017 World U23 Wrestling Championship held in Bydgoszcz, Poland, she won one of the bronze medals in the 55 kg event.

At the 2020 European Wrestling Championships held in Rome, Italy, she won the silver medal in the women's 57 kg event. In the final, she lost against Grace Bullen of Norway.

In March 2021, she earned a spot in the women's 57 kg event at the European Qualification Tournament for a Ukrainian wrestler to compete at the 2020 Summer Olympics in Tokyo, Japan. Tetyana Kit competed in the women's 57 kg event.

In May 2021, she won the gold medal in her event at the European U23 Wrestling Championship held in Skopje, North Macedonia. In November 2021, she also won the gold medal in the 57 kg event at the 2021 U23 World Wrestling Championships held in Belgrade, Serbia.

In 2022, she won the gold medal in her event at the Matteo Pellicone Ranking Series 2022 held in Rome, Italy. She won one of the bronze medals in the 57kg event at the 2022 World Wrestling Championships held in Belgrade, Serbia. A month later, she also won one of the bronze medals in her event at the 2022 U23 World Wrestling Championships held in Pontevedra, Spain.

She won the silver medal in her event at the 2023 Ibrahim Moustafa Tournament held in Alexandria, Egypt.

Achievements

References

External links 
 

Living people
Year of birth missing (living people)
Place of birth missing (living people)
Ukrainian female sport wrestlers
World Wrestling Championships medalists
European Wrestling Championships medalists
European Wrestling Champions
21st-century Ukrainian women